The East Fork Kaweah River is a  tributary of the Kaweah River in Tulare County, California. The river begins below Farewell Gap at the head of the Mineral King Valley in Sequoia National Park. It then receives its largest tributary, Horse Creek, from the left before leaving the national park and turning northwest.

The narrow, winding one-lane Mineral King Road runs along the East Fork canyon, providing the only vehicular access to Mineral King.

See also
List of rivers of California

References

Rivers of Tulare County, California
Tulare Basin watershed